In 1989, the United States Navy was on the verge of massive cuts to military spending cuts including ship and aircraft procurement. These forces were expected to fight the Soviet Union, Warsaw Pact and other potential adversaries in case of a war breaking out.

United States Atlantic Fleet

Commander, Naval Air Forces, Atlantic Fleet

United States 2nd Fleet

Carrier Group 2 - (Naval Station Norfolk, Virginia, US) 
Carrier Group 2
USS Coral Sea CV-43 - Midway Class Aircraft Carrier (Flagship)
Carrier Air Wing 13 - Tail Code: AK
VFA-132 Privateers - 12x F/A-18A Hornet - (NAS Cecil Field, Florida, US)
VFA-137 Kestrels - 12x F/A-18A Hornet - (NAS Cecil Field, Florida, US)
VMFA-451 Warlords (US Marines Corps) - F/A-18A Hornet - (MCAS Beaufort, South Carolina, US)
VA-55 Warhorses - A-6E TRAM Intruder - (NAS Oceania, Virginia, US)
VA-65 Tigers - A-6E TRAM Intruder/KA-6D Intruder - (NAS Oceania, Virginia, US)
VAQ-133 Wizards - EA-6B Prowler
VAW-127 Seabats - E-2C Hawkeye
HS-17 Neptune's Riders - SH-3H Sea King

Cruiser-Destroyer Group 2 - (Naval Station Norfolk, Virginia, US)

 USS America CV-66 - Kitty Hawk Class Aircraft Carrier (America Sub-Class) - (Flagship)
 Carrier Air Wing 1 - Tail Code: AB
 VF-33 Starfighters - F-14A Tomcat
 VF-102 Diamondbacks - F-14A Tomcat
 VFA-82 Marauders - 10x F/A-18C Hornet - (NAS Cecil Field, Florida, US)
 VFA-86 Sidewinders - 10x F/A-18C Hornet - (NAS Cecil Field, Florida, US)
 VA-85 Black Falcons - A-6E TRAM Intruder/KA-6D Intruder - (NAS Oceania, Virginia, US)
 VAQ-137 Rooks - EA-6B Prowler - (NAS Whidbey Island, Washington State, US)
 VAW-123 Screwtops - 4x E-2C Hawkeye
 VS-32 Maulers - 10x S-3A Viking
 HS-11 Dragon Slayers - 6x SH-3H Sea King
Carrier Group 6 - (Naval Station Mayport, Florida, US)

 USS Forrestal CV-59 - Forrestal Class Aircraft Carrier
 Carrier Air Wing 6 - Tail Code: AE
 VF-11 Red Rippers - F-14A Tomcat
 VF-31 Tomcatters - F-14A Tomcat
 VA-37 Bulls - A-7E Corsair II
 VA-105 Gunslingers - A-7E Corsair II
 VA-176 Thunderbolts - A-6E TRAM Intruder/KA-6D Intruder
 VAQ-142 Grim Watchdogs - EA-6B Prowler
 VS-28 Gamblers - S-3A Viking
 VAW-122 Steeljaws - E-2C Hawkeye
 HS-15 Red Lions - SH-3H Sea King
 USS Saratoga CV-60 - Forrestal Class Aircraft Carrier
 Carrier Air Wing 17 - Tail Code: AA
 VF-74 Be-Devilers - 6x F-14A Tomcat/6x F-14A+ Tomcat
 VF-103 Sluggers - 8x F-14A Tomcat/7x F-14A+ Tomcat
 VFA-81 Sunliners - 14x F/A-18C Hornet
 VFA-83 Rampagers - 14x F/A-18C Hornet
 VA-35 Black Panthers - 10x A-6E TRAM Intruder/KA-6D Intruder
 VAQ-132 Scorpions - EA-6B Prowler
 VS-30 Diamondcutters - 8x S-3B Viking
 VAW-125 Torchbearers/Tigertails - E-2C Hawkeye
 HS-9 Sea Griffins - SH-3H Sea Kings

Carrier Group 8 - (Naval Station Norfolk, Virginia, US)
USS Dwight D. Eisenhower CVN-69 - Nimitz Class Aircraft Carrier - (Naval Station Norfolk, Virginia, US)
Carrier Air Wing 7 - Tail Code: AG
VF-142 Ghostriders - F-14A Tomcat
VF-143 Pukin' Dogs - F-14A Tomcat
VFA-131 Wildcats - F/A-18A Hornet
VFA-136 Knight Hawks - F/A-18A Hornet
VA-34 Blue Blasters - A-6E TRAM Intruder/KA-6D Intruder
VAQ-140 Patriots - EA-6B Prowler
VAW-121 Bluetails - E-2C Hawkeye
VS-31 Topcats - S-3B Viking
HS-5 Night Dippers - SH-3H Sea King

Destroyer Squadron 6 (Charleston Naval Shipyard, South Carolina, US) 

 USS Carr FFG-52 - Oliver Hazard Perry Class Frigate

Commander, Submarine Force, U.S. Atlantic Fleet (COMSUBLANT) 
 USS Baton Rouge SSN-689 - Los Angeles Class Attack Submarine
 Submarine Squadron 8 (Naval Station Norfolk, Virginia, US)
USS Memphis SSN-691 - Los Angeles Class Attack Submarine
USS Jacksonville SSN-699 - Los Angeles Class Attack Submarine
Submarine Development Squadron 12 (Naval Submarine Base New London, Groton, Connecticut, US)
USS Augusta SSN-710 - Los Angeles Class Attack Submarine

United States 6th Fleet

Task Force 60 

 Theodore Roosevelt Carrier Battlegroup *(Part of 6th Fleet Jan 11 to June 20)
 Carrier Group 8 - (Naval Station Norfolk, Virginia, US)
USS Theodore Roosevelt CVN-71 - Nimitz Class Aircraft Carrier 
Carrier Air Wing 8 - Tail Code: AJ
VF-41 Black Aces - F-14A Tomcat
VF-84 Jolly Rogers - F-14A Tomcat
VFA-15 Valions - F/A-18A Hornet
VFA-87 Golden Warriors - F/A-18A Hornet
VA-35 Black Panthers - A-6E TRAM Intruder
VA-36 Roadrunners - A-6E TRAM Intruder
VAQ-141 Shadowhawks - EA-6B Prowler
VAW-124 Bear Aces - E-2C Hawkeye
VS-24 Scouts - S-3A Viking
HS-9 Griffins - SH-3H Sea King
 USS South Carolina CGN-37 - California Class Cruiser - (Naval Station Norfolk, Virginia, US)
 USS Leyte Gulf CG-55 - Ticonderoga Class VLS Cruiser - (Naval Station Mayport, Florida, US)
 USS Charles F. Adams DDG-2 - Charles F. Adams Class Destroyer (Naval Station Mayport, Florida, US)
 USS Sellers DDG-11 - Charles F. Adams Class Destroyer (Charleston Naval Shipyard, South Carolina, US)
 USS Conyngham DDG-17 - Charles F. Adams Class Destroyer
 USS Farragut DDG-37 - Farragut Class Destroyer - (Naval Station Norfolk, Virginia, US)
USS William V. Pratt DDG-44 - Farragut Class Destroyer - (Charleston Naval Shipyard, South Carolina, US)
Submarine Squadron 8 (Naval Station Norfolk, Virginia, US)
USS Hyman G. Rickover SSN-709 - Los Angeles Class Attack Submarine

Commander in Chief, United States Pacific Fleet

United States 3rd Fleet

Commander, Naval Air Forces, Pacific Fleet 

 Battle Group Bravo
 Carrier Group 7
USS Nimitz CVN-68 - Nimitz Class Aircraft Carrier (Puget Sound, Washington State, US)
Carrier Air Wing 9 - Tail Code: NG
VF-24 Fighting Renegades - F-14A Tomcat --> F-14A+ Tomcat
VF-211 Checkmates - F-14A Tomcat --> F-14A+ Tomcat
 VA-146 Blue Diamonds - A-7E Corsair II --> VFA-146 Blue Diamonds - F/A-18C (N) Hornet
 VA-147 Argonauts - A-7E Corsair II --> VFA-147 Argonauts - F/A-18C (N) Hornet
VA-165 Boomers - 10x A-6E TRAM Intruder/4x KA-6D Intruder - (NAS Whidbey Island, Washington State, U.S.)
VAQ-138 Yellow Jackets - 4x EA-6B Prowler
VAW-112 Golden Hawks - E-2C Hawkeye
 VS-33 Screwbirds - S-3A Viking
HS-2 Golden Falcons - SH-3H Sea King
USS Antietam CG-54 - Ticonderoga Class VLS Class Cruiser

Commander, Carrier Group 1 
Battle Group Echo
Cruiser-Destroyer Group 5
USS Ranger CV-61 - Forrestal Class Aircraft Carrier
Carrier Air Wing 2 - Tail Code: NE
VF-1 Wolfpack - 8x F-14A Tomcat - (NAS Miramar, California, US)
VF-2 Bounty Hunters - 6x F-14A Tomcat - (NAS Miramar, California, US)
VA-145 Swordsmen - 12x A-6E TRAM Intruder - (NAS Whidbey Island, Washington State, US)
VMA(AW)-121 Green Knights (US Marine Corps) - 14x A-6E TRAM Intruder - (MCAS El Toro, California, US)
VAQ-131 Lancers - 4x EA-6B Prowler
VAW-116 Sun Kings - 4x E-2C Hawkeye - (NAS Miramar, California, US)
 VS-38 Red Griffins - 9x S-3A Viking
HS-14 Chargers - 6x SH-3H Sea King
Carrier Group 3 (NAS Alameda, California, US)
USS Carl Vinson CVN-70 - Nimitz Class Aircraft Carrier
Carrier Air Wing 15 - Tail Code: NL
VF-51 Screaming Eagles - F-14A Tomcat
VF-111 Sundowners - F-14A Tomcat
VA-27 Royal Maces - A-7E Corsair II
VA-97 Warhawks - A-7E Corsair II
VA-52 Knightriders - A-6E SWIP Intruder/KA-6D Intruder
VAQ-134 Garudas - EA-6B Prowler ICAP II
VAW-114 Hormel Hogs - E-2C Hawkeye
 VS-29 Dragonfires - S-3A Viking
HS-4 Black Knights - SH-3H Sea King
 Battle Group Delta
USS Constellation CV-64 - Kitty Hawk Class Aircraft Carrier (NAS North Island, San Diego, California, US)
Carrier Air Wing 14 - Tail Code: NK
VF-21 Freelancers - 8x F-14A Tomcat - (NAS Miramar, California, US)
VF-154 Black Knights - 8x F-14A Tomcat - (NAS Miramar, California, US)
VFA-25 Fist of the Fleet - 10x F/A-18A Hornet - (NAS Lemoore, California, US)
VFA-113 Stingers - 11x F/A-18A Hornet - (NAS Lemoore, California, US)
VA-196 Main Battery - 10x A-6E TRAM Intruder/4x KA-6D Intruder - (NAS Whidbey Island, Washington State, US)
VAQ-139 Cougars - 4x EA-6B Prowler - (NAS Whidbey Island, Washington State, US)
VAW-113 Black Eagles - E-2C Hawkeye - (NAS Miramar, California, US) 
VS-37 Sawbucks - S-3A Viking - (NAS North Island, San Diego, California, US)
HS-8 Eightballers - SH-3H Sea King - (NAS North Island, San Diego, California, US)
USS Buchanan DDG-14 - Charles F. Adams Class Destroyer
USS Harold E. Holt FF-1074 - Knox Class Frigate

Reference:

Cruiser-Destroyer Group 3 (NAS Alameda, California, US) 
 USS Enterprise CVN-65 - Enterprise Class Aircraft Carrier - (NAS Alameda, California)
 Carrier Air Wing 11 - Tail Code: NH
 VF-114 Aardvarks - 8x F-14A Tomcat - (NAS Miramar, California, US)
 VF-213 Black Lions - 8x F-14A Tomcat - (NAS Miramar, California, US)
 VA-22 Fighting Redcocks - 10x A-7E Corsair II - (NAS Lemoore, California, US)
 VA-94 Shrikes - 10x A-7E Corsair II - (NAS Lemoore, California, US)
 VA-95 Green Lizards - 10x A-6E TRAM Intruder/4x KA-6D Intruder - (NAS Whidbey Island, Washington State, US)
 VAQ-135 Black Ravens - 4x EA-6B Prowler - (NAS Whidbey Island, Washington State, US)
 VAW-117 Wallbangers - 4x E-2C Hawkeye - (NAS Miramar, California, US) 
 VS-21 Redtails - 11x S-3A Viking - (NAS North Island, San Diego, California, US)
 HS-6 Indians - 6x SH-3H Sea King - (NAS North Island, San Diego, California, US)
USS Valley Forge CG-50 - Ticonderoga Class Cruiser - (Naval Base San Diego, California)
USS Fox CG-33 - Belknap Class Cruiser - (Naval Base San Diego, California)

Destroyer Squadron 23 
USS Herny B. Wilson DDG-7 - Charles F. Adams Class Destroyer
USS Marvin Shields FF-1066 - Knox Class Frigate

Commander, Submarine Force, U.S. Pacific Fleet (COMSUBPAC) 

 Submarine Squadron 7 (Naval Station Pearl Harbour, Hawaii, US)
 USS Los Angeles SSN-688 - Los Angeles Class Attack Submarine
 Submarine Group 5
Submarine Squadron 11 (Naval Base Point Loma, San Diego, California, US)
USS Louisville SSN-724 - Los Angeles Class Attack Submarine

 Submarine Squadron 17 (Naval Submarine Base Bangor, Kitsap, Washington State, US)
USS Alabama SSBN-731 - Ohio Class Ballistic Missile Submarine
USS Alaska SSBN-732 - Ohio Class Ballistic Missile Submarine

United States 7th Fleet

USS Blue Ridge LCC-19 - Blue Ridge Class Command Ship - Flagship of the 7th Fleet (U.S. Fleet Activities Yokosuka, Japan)

Commander, Battle Force 7th Fleet (CTF-70) - Battle Group Alfa - (U.S. Fleet Activities Yokosuka, Japan)

USS Midway CV-41 - Midway Class Aircraft Carrier 
Carrier Air Wing 5 - Tail Code: NF (NAF Atsugi)
VFA-151 Vigilantes - 11x F/A-18A Hornet (1 loss on June 22, 1989)
VFA-192 Golden Dragons - 12x F/A-18A Hornet
VFA-195 Dambusters - 12x F/A-18A Hornet
VA-115 Eagles - 7x A-6E TRAM Intruder/ 2x KA-6D Intruder
VA-185 Nighthawks - 7x A-6E TRAM Intruder/ 2x KA-6D Intruder
VAQ-136 Gauntlets - 4x EA-6B Prowler ICAP II
VAW-115 Liberty Bells - 5x E-2C Group 0 Hawkeye
HS-12 Wyverns - 6x SH-3H Sea King

Destroyer Squadron 15 - (U.S. Fleet Activities Yokosuka, Japan) 
USS Bunker Hill CG-52 - Ticonderoga Class VLS Class Cruiser
USS Oldendorf DD-972 - Spruance Class Destroyer
USS Fife DD-991 - Spruance Class Destroyer
USS Towers DDG-9 - Charles F. Adams Class Destroyer
USS Cochrane DDG-21 - Charles F. Adams Class Destroyer
USS Curts FFG-38 - Oliver Hazard Perry Class Frigate
USS Rodney M. Davis FFG-60 - Oliver Hazard Perry Class Frigate

U.S. Fleet Activities Sasebo, Japan 

 USS Dubuque LPD-8 - Austin Class Amphibious transport dock
 USS Darter SS-576 - Darter Class Submarine (Sailed to Pearl Harbor on August 18)
 USS Barbel SS-580 - Barbel Class Submarine (Sailed to Pearl Harbor on September 18)

References

Further reading 
Norman Polmar, The Ships and Aircraft of the U.S. Fleet, Fourteenth Edition, 1987, Naval Institute Press, Annapolis, MD., "Fleet Organization" chapter, lists units and formations drawn from Standard Naval Distribution List (SNDL) and elsewhere
Norman Polmar, The Ships and Aircraft of the U.S. Fleet, Fifteenth Edition, 1992, Naval Institute Press, Annapolis, MD., "Fleet Organization" chapter, lists units and formations drawn from Standard Naval Distribution List (SNDL) and elsewhere

Structures of military commands and formations in 1989
Military units and formations of the United States Navy